The 1996–97 season was Heart of Midlothian F.C.s 14th consecutive season of play in the Scottish Premier Division. Hearts also competed in the  Scottish Cup and the Scottish League Cup.

Fixtures

Friendlies

Cup winners' cup

League Cup

Scottish Cup

Scottish Premier Division

Scottish Premier Division table

Stats

Scorers

See also
List of Heart of Midlothian F.C. seasons

References 

Source London Hearts season 1996-97

External links 
 Official Club website

Heart of Midlothian F.C. seasons
Heart of Midlothian